Lwów district football competitions were a regional association football competitions on territory of Lwów Voivodeship, Tarnopol Voivodeship, and Stanisławów Voivodeship (1920-1934), Poland (then Second Polish Republic) in 1920–1939. The competitions were organized by the Lwówskie Okręgowych Związków Piłki Nożnej, Lwówskie OZPN.

The league was created in 1920 as the original four district leagues of the Polish Football Union and is considered a continuation of the Austrian Football Championship of Galicia in 1913–1914.

The competitions were conducted on territory of modern West Ukraine which during the World War II was annexed by the Soviet Union and added to the Soviet Ukraine (Ukrainian Soviet Socialist Republic). The Lwów District League is considered to be a football precursor of the Lviv Oblast Football Federation championship in the modern Ukraine and the Subcarpathia Regional Division of the Polish Fifth League.

Winners of the league qualified to all-Polish championship among winners of all district leagues in Poland. In 1927 number of better Polish clubs organized all-Polish National League which was a predecessor of the today's Ekstraklasa. At the same time winners of the district league since then qualified to regional play-offs, a winner of which was advancing to the newly formed National League.

In 1928 and 1929 the Lwów District League temporarily administered the regional football competitions in Wołyń Voivodeship as Wołyń subgroup, which in 1930 officially formed the Wołyń District League.

Champions
List of the top tier's winners of the district league

Winners
 5 – Pogoń Lwów
 4 – Polonia Przemyśl
 3 – Czarni Lwów
 2 – Lechia Lwów
 1 – 4 clubs 6th Aviation Regiment, Rewera Stanisławów, Resovia, Junak Drohobycz

Wołyń subgroup

Separate football competitions were established in 1928 in Wołyń Voivodeship under administration of the Lwów District Football Union (OZPN) as a separate subgroup out teams that previously competed in the Lublin District League. Winners of the newly established competitions were not allowed to the promotional play-offs.

See also
 Lviv Oblast Football Federation

Notes

References

External links
 Contenders of a football region (Звитяжці футбольного краю). Football Federation of Ukraine. 26 January 2010

2
History of football in Poland
Lwów Voivodeship
Tarnopol Voivodeship
Stanisławów Voivodeship